Bastanius is a genus of spiders in the family Hersiliidae. It was first described in 2016 by Mirshamsi, Zamani & Marusik. , it contains 2 species, both found in Iran.

References

Hersiliidae
Araneomorphae genera
Spiders of Asia